Moreland is an unincorporated community in Moreland Township, Pope County, Arkansas, United States.

Moreland was known as "Cross Plains" or "Isbel Creek" before it was renamed "Moreland" after a stagecoach passenger observed that the community would need "more land".

References

Unincorporated communities in Pope County, Arkansas
Unincorporated communities in Arkansas